Anarsia retamella is a moth in the family Gelechiidae. It was described by Pierre Chrétien in 1915. It is found in North Africa.

References

retamella
Moths described in 1915
Moths of Africa